Ville Runola (born January 4, 1993) is a Finnish ice hockey defenceman. His is currently playing with HC TPS in the Finnish SM-liiga.

Runola made his SM-liiga debut on October 27, 2012, playing with HC TPS during the 2012–13 SM-liiga season, when he came into the game in relief of Atte Engren.

References

External links

1993 births
Living people
Finnish ice hockey goaltenders
HC TPS players
Sportspeople from Turku